K. Gireesh Kumar is an Indian screenwriter in Malayalam cinema.

Films

References

External links

Malayalam screenwriters
Living people
Year of birth missing (living people)